Psi Iota Xi is a women's philanthropic organization with chapters throughout the midwestern United States.

History
Psi Iota Xi was founded in 1897 in Muncie, Indiana by a group of students and teachers. The organization has chartered chapters in Illinois, Indiana, Ohio, Kentucky, and Michigan.  As of 2009, there are approximately 3,500 members in 135 chapters.

Purposes
Psi Iota Xi chapters are focused on raising money and offering volunteer service to improve the quality of life in their communities, with special emphasis on speech and hearing-related causes.

References

External links
 Official site
 Archive site

Organizations established in 1897
Fraternities and sororities in the United States
Women's organizations based in the United States
Muncie, Indiana
Sororities